Francisco Javier Paredes Rodríguez (born 4 December 1959) is a Mexican politician affiliated with the National Action Party. As of 2014 he served as Deputy of the LX Legislature of the Mexican Congress representing Baja California.

References

1959 births
Living people
Politicians from Baja California
National Action Party (Mexico) politicians
21st-century Mexican politicians
Autonomous University of Baja California alumni
Deputies of the LX Legislature of Mexico
Members of the Chamber of Deputies (Mexico) for Baja California